

do

dob-dol
dobupride (INN)
dobutamine (INN)
Dobutrex
DOCA
docarpamine (INN)
docebenone (INN)
docetaxel (INN)
doconazole (INN)
doconexent (INN)
docusate sodium (INN)
dodeclonium bromide (INN)
dofamium chloride (INN)
dofetilide (INN)
dolasetron (INN)
Dolene
doliracetam (INN)
Dolobid
Dolophine

dom-doq
domazoline (INN)
Domeboro
domiodol (INN)
domiphen bromide (INN)
domipizone (INN)
domitroban (INN)
domoprednate (INN)
domoxin (INN)
domperidone (INN)
donepezil (INN)
donetidine (INN)
Donnatal
Donnatal "D" tablets
Donnatal Elixir
Donnatal Extentabs
dopamantine (INN)
dopamine (INN)
Dopar
Dope (Cannabis, cocaine, heroin or methamphetamine, depending on region)
dopexamine (INN)
Dopram
dopropidil (INN)
doqualast (INN)

dor-dow
Doral. Redirects to Quazepam.
doramapimod (USAN)
doramectin (INN)
dorastine (INN)
doreptide (INN)
doretinel (INN)
Doribax
Doriden
doripenem (USAN)
dorlimomab aritox (INN)
dorlixizumab (USAN)
Dormate
dornase alfa (INN)
Doryx
dorzolamide (INN)
dosergoside (INN)
dosmalfate (INN)
Dostinex
dosulepin (INN)
dotarizine (INN)
dotefonium bromide (INN)
dovitinib (USAN, INN)
Dovonex
Dow-Isoniazid

dox
doxacurium chloride (INN)
doxaminol (INN)
doxapram (INN)
doxaprost (INN)
doxazosin (INN)
doxefazepam (INN)
doxenitoin (INN)
doxepin (INN)
doxibetasol (INN)
doxifluridine (INN)
Doxil
Doxil (Sequus Pharmaceuticals, Inc.)
doxofylline (INN)
doxorubicin (INN)
doxpicomine (INN)
Doxy-Sleep-Aid
Doxy. Redirects to Doxycycline.
Doxychel
doxycycline (INN)
Doxyhexal (Hexal Australia) [Au]. Redirects to doxycycline.
doxylamine (INN)